Lupeol synthase (LUPI, BPW, RcLUS) is an enzyme with systematic name (3S)-2,3-epoxy-2,3-dihydrosqualene mutase (cyclizing, lupeol-forming). This enzyme catalyses the following chemical reaction

 (3S)-2,3-epoxy-2,3-dihydrosqualene  lupeol

Also forms some beta-amyrin.

References

External links 
 

EC 5.4.99